Peter Svätojánsky (born January 12, 1977) is a Slovakian ski mountaineer and has been member of the SSA national squad since 1999.

Svätojánsky was born in Poprad. He started ski mountaineering in 1990 and competed first in 1992. He lives in Nová Lesná.

Selected results 
 2001:
 3rd, European Championship team race (together with Miroslav Leitner)
 2002:
 3rd, World Championship team race (together with Miroslav Leitner)
 2004:
 5th, World Championship relay race (together with Miroslav Leitner, Branislav Kačina and Milan Madaj)
 7th, World Championship team race (together with Miroslav Leitner)
 7th, World Championship combination ranking
 2005:
 5th, European Championship relay race (together with Milan Madaj, Miroslav Leitner and Branislav Kačina)
 8th, European Championship team race (together with Miroslav Leitner)
 2006:
 4th, World Championship relay race (together with Miroslav Leitner, Milan Blaško und Milan Madaj)
 2008:
 5th, Mountain Attack marathon
 5th, World Championship single race
 9th, World Championship relay race (together with Miroslav Leitner, Jozef Hlavco and Juraj Laštík)

Pierra Menta 

 2000: 4th, together with Miroslav Leitner
 2001: 4th, together with Miroslav Leitner
 2002: 8th, together with Miroslav Leitner
 2005: 9th, together with Miroslav Leitner
 2006: 9th, together with Milan Madaj
 2008: 3rd, together with Patrick Blanc
 2010: 9th, together with Andrzej Bargiel

Trofeo Mezzalama 

 2003: 10th, together with Miroslav Leitner and Milan Madaj

External links 
 Peter Svätojánsky at SkiMountaineering.org

1977 births
Living people
Slovak male ski mountaineers
Sportspeople from Poprad